Kavaközü may refer to any of three different settlements in Turkey:

Kavaközü, Güdül, in Ankara Province
Kavaközü, Kızılcahamam, in Ankara Province
Kavaközü, Mut, in Mersin Province